David Elliott (born 10 December 1968) is a Scottish retired football forward who played in the Scottish League for Queen's Park, East Fife and Kilmarnock.

References

Living people
1968 births
Scottish footballers
Scottish Football League players
Queen's Park F.C. players
Association football forwards
Footballers from Glasgow
Kilmarnock F.C. players
East Fife F.C. players
Largs Thistle F.C. players
Scottish Junior Football Association players